Calvin Wellington (born 10 December 1995) is a Welsh professional rugby league footballer who plays as a  for Oldham RLFC in Betfred League 1.

Rugby league

St Helens
Wellington previously played rugby league for St Helens in the  Super League.

Sheffield Eagles (loan)
In July 2017, Wellington joined the Sheffield Eagles on loan until the end of the 2017 season. The Sheffield Eagles were at the time beginning their end-of-season campaign to win the Championship Shield. He joined along with two St. Helens' teammates; Liam Cooper and Jonah Cunningham.

Oldham R.L.F.C.
On 1 Nov 2021 it was reported that he had signed for Oldham RLFC in the RFL League 1

Rugby Union

Dragons
In November 2017 he joined the Welsh rugby union team the Dragons as a wing or centre in the Pro14 league.

References

External links
Workington Town profile
Dragons profile
Saints Heritage Society profile

1995 births
Living people
British sportspeople of Jamaican descent
Dragons RFC players
Oldham R.L.F.C. players
Rugby articles needing expert attention
Rugby league wingers
Sheffield Eagles players
St Helens R.F.C. players
Welsh rugby league players
Welsh rugby union players
Welsh people of Jamaican descent
Workington Town players